Prince Christian of Schleswig-Holstein  (Frederick Christian Charles Augustus; 22 January 1831 – 28 October 1917) was a minor Danish-born German prince who became a member of the British royal family through his marriage to Princess Helena of the United Kingdom, the fifth child and third daughter of Queen Victoria and Prince Albert of Saxe-Coburg-Gotha.

Early life

Prince Christian was born in Augustenborg Palace. He was the second son of Christian August II, Duke of Schleswig-Holstein-Sonderburg-Augustenburg and his wife, Countess Louise Sophie of Danneskiold-Samsøe.

In 1848, young Christian's father, Duke Christian August, placed himself at the head of a movement to resist by force the claims of Denmark upon the Duchies of Schleswig and Holstein, two personal possessions of the kings of Denmark, of which Holstein also was a part of the German Confederation. A year earlier, King Frederick VII acceded to the Danish throne without any hope of producing a male heir. Unlike Denmark proper, where the Lex Regia of 1665 allowed the throne to pass through the female royal line, in Holstein Salic Law prevailed. The duchy would most likely revert to the Schleswig-Holstein-Sonderburg-Augustenburg family, their cadet branch of the house of Holstein-Sonderburg. During the 1852 First War of Schleswig, Prince Christian briefly served with the newly constituted Schleswig-Holstein army, before he and his family were forced to flee the advancing Danish forces (see history of Schleswig-Holstein). After the war, he attended the University of Bonn, where he befriended Crown Prince Frederick William of Prussia (later the German Emperor Frederick III).

Marriage
In September 1865, while visiting Coburg, The Princess Helena met Prince Christian. The couple became engaged in December of that year. Queen Victoria gave her permission for the marriage with the provision that the couple live in Great Britain. They married at the Private Chapel at Windsor Castle on 5 July 1866. Seven days before the wedding, on 29 June 1866, the Queen granted her future son-in-law the style of Royal Highness by Royal Warrant.

In 1891, Prince Christian lost an eye when he was accidentally shot in the face by his brother-in-law, The Duke of Connaught, during a shooting party at Sandringham.

Prince and Princess Christian of Schleswig-Holstein, as they were known, made their home at Frogmore House in the grounds of Windsor Castle and later at Cumberland Lodge in Windsor Great Park. They had six children, known commonly as:
 Prince Christian Victor (14 April 1867 – 29 October 1900); never married; died young during military duty and was buried in South Africa.
 Prince Albert (28 February 1869 – 27 April 1931) who in 1921 became the titular Duke of Schleswig-Holstein and the Head of the House of Oldenburg. Never married; had an illegitimate daughter:
 Valerie Marie zu Schleswig-Holstein (3 April 1900 – 14 Aug 1953). Married firstly Ernst Johann Wagner (b. 10 Jan 1896); married secondly Engelbert-Charles, 10th Duke of Arenberg (20 April 1899 – 27 April 1974)
 Princess Helena Victoria (3 May 1870 – 13 March 1948). Never married.
 Princess Marie Louise (12 August 1872 – 8 December 1956). Married Prince Aribert of Anhalt, no issue.
 Prince Harald (12 May 1876 – 20 May 1876).
 Unnamed stillborn son (born and died 7 May 1877).

Honours and offices

Orders and decorations

Military and civil appointments
Prince Christian was given the rank of major general in the British Army in July 1866 and received promotions to the ranks of lieutenant general in August 1874 and general in October 1877. From 1869 until his death, he was honorary colonel of the 1st Volunteer Battalion, The Royal Berkshire Regiment. However, he never held a major field command or staff position. He was High Steward of Windsor and Ranger of Windsor Great Park, and was awarded a Doctor of Civil Law degree by the University of Oxford.

He received the freedom of the city of Carlisle on 7 July 1902, during a visit to the city for the Royal Agricultural Society's Show. As a "Minor Royal", he officiated at many public functions. These included participation, with the Princess Helena, in the speech day of Malvern College in 1870.

Death
Prince Christian died at Schomberg House (half of which is now part of the Oxford and Cambridge Club), Pall Mall, London, in October 1917, in his eighty-sixth year. After being initially interred in the Royal Vault at St George's Chapel, Windsor Castle, he was buried in the Royal Burial Ground, Frogmore in Windsor Great Park.

Ancestry

References

Burials at the Royal Burial Ground, Frogmore
German princes
House of Augustenburg
People from Old Windsor
People from Augustenborg, Denmark
1831 births
1917 deaths
University of Bonn alumni
Princes of Schleswig-Holstein-Sonderburg-Augustenburg
Members of the Privy Council of the United Kingdom
Royal reburials

Knights of the Garter
Knights Grand Cross of the Royal Victorian Order
Knights of Justice of the Order of St John
Recipients of the Order of the Netherlands Lion
Grand Crosses of the Order of the Star of Romania